Andriy Makarchev (born 15 November 1985) is a Ukrainian long jumper.

He competed at the 2008 Olympic Games without reaching the final.

His personal best jump is 8.13 metres, achieved in June 2008 in Istanbul.

Achievements

References

1985 births
Living people
Ukrainian male long jumpers
Athletes (track and field) at the 2008 Summer Olympics
Olympic athletes of Ukraine